The 2022 New Zealand rugby league season was the 115th season of rugby league played in New Zealand. The main feature of the year was the National Competition, run by the New Zealand Rugby League.

National Premiership 
Select matches were broadcast live by Sky Sport.

Teams 
Four teams contested the National Premiership, all in a single division round robin followed by a final.

Results

Round 1

Round 2

Round 3

Ladder 

Note: (P) = Premiers, (R) = Relegated to Championship for 2023

Final

National Championship 
Select matches were broadcast live by Sky Sport.

Teams 
Eight teams contested the National Championship, with four in the North Island Championship pool and four in the South Island Championship pool.

Ladder

North Island Championship 

Note: (P) = Promoted to Premiership for 2023

South Island Championship 

Note: (P) = Promoted to Premiership for 2023

Finals

Club Competitions

Auckland 
The 2022 season was the 115th season of the Auckland Rugby League Premiership. In the First Grade Fox Memorial Premiership, the Pt Chevalier Pirates claimed a 14 – 12 victory over the Glenora Bears in the final at Mount Smart Stadium.

In the final of the Fox Memorial Championship, the Northcote Tigers defeated the Pakuranga Jaguars 32 – 28.

Other Competitions

Australian Competitions 

The New Zealand Warriors played in their 28th professional first grade season in the Australian National Rugby League competition.

On 3 July, during the 2022 NRL season, Auckland's Mount Smart Stadium hosted its first NRL game in over two years when the Warriors defeated the Wests Tigers 22–2 in front of a sellout crowd of 26,009 fans in round 16.

The Warriors finished 15th and missed the finals as a result.

See also 

 2022 NRL season
 Super League XXVII
 Elite One Championship 2021–2022
 Elite One Championship 2022–2023
 2022 PNGNRL season

References 

2022 in New Zealand rugby league
New Zealand rugby league seasons